John Stephen Reynolds (born 27 June 1963) is a British former professional motorcycle racer from Kimberley, Nottinghamshire, England. He won the British Superbike Championship in 1992, 2001 and 2004. Reynolds is an all-time great of BSB with his 37 career wins bettered only by Shane Byrne and Ryuichi Kiyonari. His 117 podiums is 2nd all time behind Byrne, what makes this mark impressive is Reynolds scored this in 202 starts. Making him one of a select few riders to finish on the podium in over half their career starts.

His first domestic success led him into the 500 cc World Championship on a Padgetts Harris-Yamaha, taking 8 top-10 finishes over two seasons. He joined Revé Kawasaki in World Superbikes for 1995, qualifying 2nd at Brands Hatch and taking 3rd-place finishes there and Assen, en route to 10th overall. In 1996 he rode a Suzuki to 12th overall. Although he never did a full season of international racing again, he had a strong record as an occasional rider in future years, taking a win at Brands Hatch in 2000 and a pole position in 2003.

In 1997. Reynolds returned to Revé, now running Ducatis in the reformed British Superbike series with Red Bull backing. He was immediately a front-runner, finishing in the championship top 5 each year between 1997 and 2000. He took 13 BSB wins in those seasons, and scored points in every BSB race in 2000.

The dominant riders in 2000, together with Reynolds, had been Neil Hodgson and Chris Walker. With these two having moved on, the stage was set for Reynolds and Steve Hislop to duel in 2001, as only John’s team-mate, Sean Emmett, and Michael Rutter also won races. Reynolds’s second championship came when Hislop was injured in a collision between the two men.

For 2002 he moved to Suzuki's new 1000 cc four-cylinder bike, taking a win and six further podiums en route to 6th overall. He was championship runner-up in 2003, but was the fastest man by the end of the season. A run of 11 consecutive podiums at the start of 2004 made the title his to lose, and despite a less successful second half of the season he secured the title in the final round.

Reynolds broke his leg in testing before the 2005 BSB season. After a poor season, Reynolds had a serious accident at the final round at Brands Hatch during practice on 7 October, breaking four ribs on his right side, puncturing his right lung and breaking his left collarbone, and suffered injuries to his neck and back. Reynolds commented from hospital: "When I hit the barrier it was like a switch in my head flipped. Instantly I knew it was time to stop. I had received a warning with my broken leg earlier in the year. I see this as a final warning and I’ve made the decision to stop racing, more for my wife Shelley’s sanity and for the good of my family than for me."

After recovery, Reynolds took up a background role with Rizla Suzuki.

References

External links
 John Reynolds full profile
 Rider profile

1963 births
Living people
People from Kimberley, Nottinghamshire
Sportspeople from Nottinghamshire
English motorcycle racers
British Superbike Championship riders
Superbike World Championship riders
500cc World Championship riders